El Salitre is a town in the municipality of San Martín de Hidalgo in the state of Jalisco, Mexico. It has a population of 2,434 inhabitants.

Climate
Climate is characterized by relatively high temperatures and evenly distributed precipitation throughout the year, leading to very warm nights.  The Köppen Climate Classification subtype for this climate is "Cfa" (Humid Subtropical Climate).

References

External links
El Salitre at PueblosAmerica.com

Populated places in Jalisco